"Don't Let Love Go" is a song recorded by New Zealand singer-songwriters, Sharon O'Neill and Jon Stevens. The song was produced by Jay Lewis. It was released in New Zealand as a single in February 1980 and peaked at number 5 in New Zealand in March 1980.
The song was included on Stevens' debut solo album, Jezebel (1980).

Track listing
 Vinyl, 7", 45 RPM
 "Don't Let Love Go" - 4:02	
 "Wages of Love" (Rob Winch) performed by Jon Stevens

Charts

References

1980 singles
1980 songs
Sharon O'Neill songs
Jon Stevens songs
CBS Records singles
Songs written by Brenda Russell